is 2005 anime film directed by Mamoru Hosoda and produced by Toei Animation. It is the sixth animated feature film of the One Piece film series, based on the manga of the same name written and illustrated by Eiichiro Oda. It premiered in Japan on March 5, 2005, and was released to DVD on July 21, 2005.

Although all of the films were used for lighten tone with action-oriented genre, One Piece: Baron Omatsuri and the Secret Island is considered one of the darkest One Piece films ever made, following the subjects of death, grief, mercy, and sacrifice in the second half of the film.

Plot 
The Straw Hats receive an invitation to an island resort on the Grand Line run by Baron Omatsuri, and the crew travels to the island intent on relaxing and having fun. The Baron welcomes them to the resort and encourages them to enjoy themselves, but only after they complete The Trials Of Hell. The crew is hesitant, but Luffy accepts the challenge. The Straw Hats (represented by Usopp) win the first trial, but the outraged Baron demands they compete in another challenge. Luffy, Chopper, and Robin wait at the resort while the rest of the crew participates in the second trial. 

Robin questions Muchigoro, one of Baron's crewmates, about a flower on the island. Muchigoro mentions something about the Lily Carnation being at the island's summit before running off. Luffy and Chopper wander off, both meeting other pirates who had previously arrived and participated in the trials. Luffy receives an ominous warning about Baron planning to split up his crew. Chopper learns about Baron's past, but right before he figures out the mystery, he is stricken with an arrow shot by Baron. The Straw Hats (represented by two pair of duos, Zoro/Sanji and Nami/Usopp) win the second trial, but rifts begin to grow between the crew members. 

The crew notices Chopper is missing, but Baron interrupts them with a dinner party. The Baron notices Robin leaving, and she reveals to him that she was looking for the Lily Carnation. Baron reveals the flower's secret to Robin while Robin looks shocked. The Straw Hats realize that Chopper, Usopp, and Robin are gone. Arguments over who's to blame for their disappearances ensue before Baron announces the final trial. Tension between the crew results in the crew splitting up. The island known as Omatsuri Island was really a pirate island, only advertised as a resort by the Baron to lure pirates to the island to bring the same suffering and hatred he felt unto everyone else.  

Baron feeds the crew to the Lily Carnation, a flower of reincarnation, which gives life to Baron's crew. Luffy fights Baron after knowing the truth about the Lily Carnation, demanding Baron to return his crew. After a hard and traumatizing battle, Luffy manages to defeat Baron and save his crew from the Lily Carnation with helps from other pirates on the island. Baron cries for his friends that were lost and how he is alone. He had been fooling himself for years with the false constructs of his crew created by the Lily Carnation. 

Each of his dead crewmates speak with him, telling him that they were happy to be remembered, but not with his corrupted charade. They apologize for leaving him alone for so long but believe it would be for the best if he forgets the night they died and finds new friends. Luffy lays exhausted on the ground while the crew all appear unharmed with no memory of the incident. The Straw Hats gather around Luffy, wondering how he can sleep in such a place, and Luffy laughs.

Voice cast

Development 
The animation in this film is very different from the television series, using the style often seen in Mamoru Hosoda's films. Some of the later episodes use styles similar to those seen in this film.

Related media 
Tatsuya Hamazaki adapted the film's story into a 228 pages light novel, released on March 14, 2005.

Reception

Box office 
The film had a six-week run in the Top 10 of the Japanese box office. It made third place in its first week, fourth place in its second week, followed by two weeks at sixth place, fifth place in its fifth week, and seventh place in the sixth week.

See also 
 One Piece (anime)
 List of One Piece films
 List of One Piece media

References

Baron Omatsuri and the Secret Island
Toei Animation films
Films directed by Mamoru Hosoda
Films scored by Kohei Tanaka